Spacemonkeyz are a musical group consisting of Darren Galea, Richie Stevens and Gavin Dodds. They came together when Galea created a dub remix of the Gorillaz' "Tomorrow Comes Today" ("Tomorrow Dub", which was released as a B-side on the "Tomorrow Comes Today" single), which Gorillaz founder Damon Albarn liked so much that he asked Galea to remix the whole album Gorillaz. The resulting album, Laika Come Home, was released in July 2002. The album's first and only single "Lil' Dub Chefin'" reached #73 on the UK Singles Chart.

They also wrote an original song with Taiwanese singer Stanley Huang and rapper The Last Emperor, "Spacemonkeyz Theme", which appeared as a B-side on "Lil' Dub Chefin'", and did a remix of the Herbert Grönemeyer single "Mensch". Darren Galea performed turntables as part of the Gorillaz live band on all of the 'Gorillaz' & 'Demon Days' Live dates between 2000 and 2006.

Like the Gorillaz, they are a virtual band (though not to the degree that Gorillaz are). According to the fictional Gorillaz biography Rise of the Ogre, the group is an actual team of monkeys used in space tests who had stolen the tracks from an unattended Kong Studios and remixed them without Gorillaz's permission.

Since the release of Laika Come Home, the band has not released any new material as of 2023.
On the Hallelujah Monkeyz podcast on September 4th 2017, Richie Stevens announced that a new independent Spacemonkeyz EP was in the making, and they were trying to get a label to help them distribute music on social media platforms such as Spotify and Youtube.

Discography

Albums
2002: Spacemonkeyz vs Gorillaz – Laika Come Home

Singles
2002: Spacemonkeyz vs Gorillaz – "Lil' Dub Chefin'"
2002: Herbert Grönemeyer – "Mensch" (Spacemonkeyz Remix)

References

External links
Space Monkeyz profiles on the official Gorillaz homepage

British electronic music groups
Musical groups established in 2002
British musical trios
Parlophone artists
Virgin Records albums
Gorillaz
2002 establishments in the United Kingdom